Hygroaster is a genus of mushroom-forming fungi in the family Hygrophoraceae. The genus was described by mycologist Rolf Singer in 1955.

See also

List of Agaricales genera

References

External links

Agaricales genera
Taxa named by Rolf Singer
Tricholomataceae